Lagavulin distillery is a malt whisky distillery in the village of Lagavulin on the south of the island of Islay, Scotland. It distills spirit that will become Islay single malt Scotch whisky.

Lagavulin is owned by Diageo, a multinational beverage alcohol company headquartered in London. It was previously marketed under the Classic Malts range of single malts, which is now defunct.

The standard bottling is a 16-year-old, bottled at 43% ABV. They also bottle a Distiller's edition, finished in Pedro Ximénez Sherry casks. Alongside these, they regularly release a 12-year-old cask strength version and various older and rarer expressions.

The name Lagavulin is an anglicisation of Lag a' Mhuilinn, the Scottish Gaelic for hollow of the mill.

Distillery 

The distillery of Lagavulin officially dates from 1816, when John Johnston and Archibald Campbell Brooks constructed two distilleries on the site. One of them became Lagavulin, taking over the other—which one is not exactly known. Records show illicit distillation in at least ten illegal distilleries on the site as far back as 1742, however. 

The distillery was run by John Johnston until 1835 at which point the distillery had a valuation of £1,103 9s 8d.. It was taken over by Alexander Graham who installed his son Walter Graham as the distiller. Walter ran it until 1848 when he moved to Laphroaig and presumably his brother John Crawford Graham took charge. In 1849 improvements were carried out to extend the buildings and provide new roads and access. Later John Craoford Graham entered into a partnership with James Logan Mackie. John Crowford had other business interested in Glasgow and gradually lessened his direct influence over the distillery which left James Logan Mackie in charge from 1856. In 1878 Peter Mackie joined his uncle's firm and in the mid-1880s, they established Mackie & Co. to market Lagavulin and other whiskies in London and further afield. Several legal battles ensued with their neighbour Laphroaig, brought about after the distiller at Lagavulin, Peter Mackie, leased the Laphroaig distillery. It is said that Mackie attempted to copy Laphroaig's style. Since the water and peat at Lagavulin's premises was different from that at Laphroaig's, the result did not match. Peter Mackie took over as sole partner in 1889. In 1895 the two businesses amalgamated as Mackie & Co (Distillers) and began to blend White Horse using whisky from Lagavulin. In 1895, Mackie's became a limited company. Peter was in charge until 1902 by which time he was in partnership with Andrew Hair Holm. The partnership held a lease of Lagavulin for £800 per year for 50 years. 

The White Horse brand became well-known for its quality and won many awards. In 1908 Mackie and Co were honoured by Royal Warrant Appointment as purveyors of White Horse whisky to King Edward VII.  

In the early 1920s the distillery was sold off by Iain Ramsay to Peter Mackie for £16,000. In 1923 the firm was acquired by Buchanan Dewar Ltd who continued with the White Horse brand.  The company joined Distillers Company in 1925,  which was acquired by Guinness in 1986, and Guinness merged with Grand Metropolitan to form Diageo in 1997. 

The Lagavulin distillery is located in the village of the same name.

Lagavulin is known for its producer's use of a slow distillation speed and pear shaped pot stills. The two wash stills have a capacity of 11,000 litres and the two spirit stills of 12,500 litres each.

Accolades 

International spirits ratings competitions have generally given Lagavulin's 16-year spirit extremely high scores. The San Francisco World Spirits Competition, for instance, gave the 16-year four consecutive double gold medals between 2005 and 2008 and has awarded it gold medals in the years since. Wine Enthusiast Magazine put the 16-year in its 90–95 point interval in 2004. Spirits ratings aggregator proof66.com, which averages scores from the San Francisco Spirits Competition, Wine Enthusiast, and others, classifies the spirit in its highest ("Tier 1") performance category.

Managers 

Murdoch McEwan 1925 - 1945
Jack Wilson circa 1974
Neil Gillies, 1975–1980
Ian Marland, 1980–1983
Alistair Robertson, 1984–1988
Grant Carmichael, 1988–1995
Mike Nicolson, 1995 – October 1998
Donald Renwick, 1998–2005
John Thomson, 2005–2006
Graham Logie, 2006–2008
Peter Campbell, 2008–2010
Georgie Crawford, 2010–2018
Colin Gordon, 2018–2020
Pierrick Guillaume, 2020-2022
Jordan Paisley, 2022-

Cultural references 

 Michael Schur, co-creator of NBC's Parks and Recreation  made Lagavulin the drink of choice of character Ron Swanson (Nick Offerman), featuring it throughout the series. 
 The Lagavulin distillery was featured in the two-part opening episode of the show's sixth season, titled "London."
 The Lagavulin distilery was bought by Ron Swanson in the last episode of the show's seventh season, titled "One Last Ride."
 In The West Wing (season 3, episode 15, titled 'Dead Irish Writers'), Lagavulin was featured as the drink of choice of Lord John Marbury (Roger Rees).
 Lagavulin 16 was offered to the character Lionel Toussaint (Leslie Odom Jr) as his preferred drink in Glass Onion: A Knives Out Mystery

See also 
 List of whisky brands
 List of whisky distilleries in Scotland

References 

Distilleries in Scotland
Whisky distilleries in Islay
1816 establishments in Scotland
Diageo brands